Apilan and kota mara are two Malay nautical terms which refers to the structure on a vessel where the cannon is installed. This term is used especially on Malay ships and boats.

Apilan 

Apilan (or ampilan) is the wooden gunshield found in Malay prahus where cannons are placed. It has a hole to place long gun, and sometimes swivel gun can be placed over the top of the apilan. Apilan is not permanent, it can be assembled, disassembled, and moved. The crew of Malay prahu operated the long gun behind an apilan. The apilan usually situated at the bow of a prahu. This gun-shield was only put on when the ship went into action. Sunting apilan is the name given to two lelas or light guns standing on the gun-shield of a heavy gun.

Etymology 
Apilan is a true Malay word, it was not descended from any word. It is also a standalone word, due to the fact that the syllable is api-lan instead of apil-an.

Kota mara 

Kota mara is the breastwork or casement of Malay prahus. The function is to protect the gunner. Contrary to apilan, the kota mara cannot be moved. It is the permanent bulwark of the battery in a Malay piratical ship. The term saga kota mara refers to a peculiar props keeping the gun shield (apilan) in position. The word benteng is also used for this permanent breastwork. Ambong-ambong are blocks of wood forming part of the framework of the battery in a Malay piratical perahu. These blocks support the base of the benteng. The kota mara is already existed since at least the 8th century A.D., being shown in Borobudur ship bas relief.

Etymology 
The term comes from Malay word kota which in turn comes from the Sanskrit word कोट्ट (kota) which means fort, fortress, castle, fortified house, fortification, works, city, town, or place encircled by walls. The word mara may come from Malay word meaning "appear before", "forward",  "come", "moved to the front", "forward", and "advanced". Thus it can be interpreted as "breastwork before a cannon" or "breastwork at the front". According to the Great Indonesian Dictionary (KBBI), kota mara means (1) Wall on a ship to protect men mounting the cannon (2) Terrace or wall over a castle which a cannon is mounted. According to H. Warington Smyth, kota mara means transverse deck bulkhead at stem and stern (of a ship). Benteng itself means fort, battery, or redoubt.

Example on records 

Singapore resident John Crawfurd recorded Malay piracy near Singapore waters. The decks were made of split nibong wood. A crew might consist of 20-30 men, augmented with oarsmen of captured slaves. Small craft would have nine oars per side; larger ones would be double-banked, with an upper tier of oarsmen seated on the bulwark projection hidden behind rattan breastwork. Pirate armament included a stockade near the bow, with iron or brass 4-pounders, and another stockade aft, generally with two swivel guns. They also might have four or five brass swivels, or rantaka, on each side. They have bamboo shields, and were armed with spears, keris, muskets and other firearms they could get.

H. H. Frese description of personal ship of the Sultan of Riau from 1883:

Lieutnant T.J. Newbold record about the Malay pirate prahu:

See also

References 

Watercraft components
Shipbuilding
Naval warfare
Salvo weapons
Naval artillery